3-(4-Hydroxymethylbenzoyl)-1-pentylindole is a synthetic cannabinoid. It is planned to be scheduled (in group I-N) in Poland. It has been reported to the EMCDDA and Europol for the first time in 2010 under the terms of European Council Decision 2005/387/JHA of 10 May 2005 on the information exchange, risk-assessment and control of new psychoactive substances.

See also 
 Synthetic cannabis

References 

Designer drugs
Cannabinoids
Benzoylindoles